Carinariidae, known by the common name "heteropods" like their relatives in the Pterotracheoidea, is a taxonomic family of swimming or floating sea snails, pelagic marine gastropod molluscs in the clade Littorinimorpha.

Distribution
The snails of this family occur worldwide in the pelagic zone of tropical to subtropical seas. floating or swimming by moving up and down the fin-shaped front part of their foot.

Feeding habits
They feed on jellyfish, larvae of other snails and on zooplankton.

Anatomy
The cylindrical body of these snails can be divided in three regions: the proboscis, the trunk and the tail region. The body is elongated and much longer than the reduced shell. But in Pterosoma the trunk is wider and is somewhat disc-shaped. The taenioglossan radula has seven teeth in each row: one central tooth, flanked on each side by one lateral and two marginal teeth. The central tooth has three central cusps and on each side a 
large process backing away from the center. The lateral teeth terminate in a sharp point.

The protoconch in the adult shell of Carinaria and Pterosoma is located at the apex.

Taxonomy
The following two subfamilies have been recognized in the taxonomy of Bouchet & Rocroi (2005):
 Carinariinae Blainville, 1818 – synonym: Pterosomatidae, Rang, 1829
 † Brunoniinae Dieni, 1990

Genera
Genera within the family Carinariidae include:

Carinariinae
 Cardiapoda D'Orbigny, 1835
 Carinaria Lamarck, 1801
 Pterosoma Lesson, 1827 – the only one species: Pterosoma planum R. P. Lesson, 1827

† Brunoniinae
 † Brunonia G. Müller, 1898 – type genus of the subfamily Brunoniinae

References

 
 Powell A. W. B., New Zealand Mollusca, William Collins Publishers Ltd, Auckland, New Zealand 1979 
 Seapy, Roger R. 2007. Carinariidae Blainville 1818. Version 5 December 2007 in The Tree of Life Web Project

External links
 Tree of Life Carinariidae

 
Taxa named by Henri Marie Ducrotay de Blainville